"She's in Love with the Boy" is the debut single by American country music artist Trisha Yearwood. It was written by Jon Ims and was released in March 1991, from her self-titled debut album. The song reached number one on the Billboard U.S. Hot Country Singles & Tracks chart and was the first of five number ones on the country chart for Yearwood.

Content
The song is a ballad about a teenage couple named Katie and Tommy in a small town becoming betrothed. Katie's father does not approve of their relationship, and after the couple returns home late after a date, he angrily confronts them. But Katie's mother comes to their defense, pointing out to Katie's father that they were no different from Katie and Tommy when they were teenagers and how her own father disapproved of the relationship, but she married him anyway and that Katie will do the same with Tommy.

Music video
The music video was directed by Marc Ball and premiered in early 1991. It takes place on a farm and it shows some farm animals moving to the music and it shows shots of a pre-teen couple, a young adult couple, and an elderly couple, along with Yearwood sitting on a stool singing.

Chart positions

Year-end charts

References 

1991 debut singles
1991 songs
Trisha Yearwood songs
Song recordings produced by Garth Fundis
Songs about marriage
MCA Records singles